Bunji Miura (1906 – 1994) was a Japanese painter. His work was part of the painting event in the art competition at the 1936 Summer Olympics.

References

External links
 

1906 births
1994 deaths
20th-century Japanese painters
Japanese painters
Olympic competitors in art competitions
People from Niigata Prefecture